Polysynody (from Greek πολυς numerous, several, and Greek συνοδος meeting, assembly) was the system of government in use in France between 1715 and 1718 and in which each minister (secretary of state) was replaced by a council.

At the end of the reign of King Louis XIV of France, the aristocracy reacted against the concentration of powers in the person of the king, and against the takeover of the administration by commoners from the bourgeoisie (whom the king had empowered in order to weaken the unpredictable aristocracy). An aristocratic ideal of government emerged around the personalities of Fénelon (the famous archbishop of Cambrai and tutor of the Duke of Burgundy, grandson of Louis XIV and heir to the throne), the duc de Beauvilliers (governor of the duke of Burgundy), the duc de Chevreuse (son-in-law of Colbert), and the duc de Saint-Simon (reformist in the circle of the duke of Burgundy and author of famous historical memoirs). They advocated the creation of councils made up of aristocrats which would assist the king in the exercise of government power.

At the death of Louis XIV, the regent Philippe d'Orléans, in search of political support, satisfied the aristocracy by replacing the ministers and secretaries of state with eight councils (declarations of September 15 and December 14, 1715) which were dominated by the ancient aristocracy (descending from medieval knights, as opposed to the newer aristocracy of recently ennobled lawyers and civil servants). The Council of the Regency, chaired by the regent, had no real power. The other councils shared government power. They were the Council of Matters within the Kingdom (Conseil des affaires du dedans du royaume), the Council of Conscience (Conseil de conscience) for religious matters, the Council of War (Conseil de guerre), the Council of the Navy (Conseil de marine), the Council of Finance (Conseil de finance), the Council of Foreign Affairs (Conseil des affaires étrangères), and the Council of Commerce (Conseil de commerce) for internal and foreign trade as well as for royal factories (manufactures). Each council had ten members and elected one president.

Although the regent Philippe d'Orléans was cautious enough to admit all the ministers of the last government of Louis XIV (except for Nicolas Desmarets, controller-general, i.e. minister of finance, dismissed by the regent), as well as many of the high officers and civil servants of Louis XIV, to sit in the councils alongside the aristocrats, this system of government worked poorly due to the absenteeism and ineptitude of the aristocrats, as well as to conflicts of personalities.

As a result, between 1718 and 1723 the regent gradually abolished the councils despite the passionate defense of the abbot de Saint-Pierre (Discours sur la polysynodie, 1718), and he reestablished the offices of minister and secretary of state, reverting to the "ministerial despotism" of Louis XIV.

See also
Early Modern France
 Mansfield, Andrew, "The Burgundy Circle's plans to undermine Louis XIV's “absolute” state through polysynody and the high nobility", 'Intellectual History Review', Vol.27, Issue 2 (2017), pp.223-45 - http://www.tandfonline.com/doi/abs/10.1080/17496977.2016.1156346

Government of France
Political history of the Ancien Régime